Panaeolus bisporus, also known as Copelandia bisporus is a rare and widely distributed little brown mushroom that bruises blue and contains the hallucinogen psilocybin.

This mushroom is similar macroscopically to Panaeolus tropicalis, Panaeolus cambodginiensis and Panaeolus cyanescens, but can be differentiated using a microscope by its two spored basidia.

Description 

This is a little brown mushroom that grows on dung and has black spores.  It has been found in Hawaii, Southern California, North Africa, Spain and Switzerland.

Cap: 15-30 mm tan to gray fading to black sometimes when covered with spores and with a defined ring zone somewhat globe shaped or bell shaped to convex, hardly expanding, margin often torn and pedaled, smooth not viscid, and slightly wrinkled and pitted with age. Dark grey-brown drying whitish.

Gills: adnexed or narrowly attachedtightly packed, mottled gray to jet black, white edges

Stem: white, fibrous, 65-120 mm long 2-3 mm thick, hollow, translucent gray, bruising heavily blue where bruised

Spores: jet black, elliptical, 12-14 x 8-10 x 6-7.5 µm smooth and opaque, elongated with germ pore straight off the end

Habitat: saprotrophic on grasses

Microscopic features: 2 spored basidia 18 - 23 × 8-10 µm, cheilocystidia are bottle shaped and clear 20-30 µm, metuloids with yellow brown walls 40-55 × 12-15 µm some with excreted crystals

See also

List of Panaeolus species

References

External links
 Mushroom Observer - Panaeolus bisporus
 Panaeolus bisporus microscopy composite
 Panaeolus bisporus photo

bisporus
Psychoactive fungi
Psychedelic tryptamine carriers
Fungi of Hawaii
Fungi of Africa
Fungi of North America
Fungi of Europe
Fungi without expected TNC conservation status